The 1993 All-Big Eight Conference football team consists of American football players chosen by various organizations for All-Big Eight Conference teams for the 1993 NCAA Division I-A football season.  The selectors for the 1993 season included the Associated Press (AP).

Offensive selections

Quarterbacks
 Cale Gundy, Oklahoma (AP-1)

Running backs
 Calvin Jones, Nebraska (AP-1)
 June Henley, Kansas (AP-1)

Tight ends
 A. J. Ofodile, Missouri (AP-1)

Wide receivers
 Charles Johnson, Colorado (AP-1)
 Andre Coleman, Kansas State (AP-1)

Centers
 Quentin Neujahr, Kansas State (AP-1)

Offensive linemen
 Zach Wiegert, Nebraska (AP-1)
 Lance Lundberg, Nebraska (AP-1)
 Doug Skartvedt, Iowa State (AP-1)
 Mike Bedosky, Missouri (AP-1)

Defensive selections

Defensive ends
 Trev Alberts, Nebraska (AP-1)
 Jason Gildon, Oklahoma State (AP-1)

Defensive lineman
 Chris Maumalanga, Kansas (AP-1)
 Keven Ramaekers, Nebraska (AP-1)
 Terry Connealy, Nebraska (AP-1)

Linebackers
 Keith Burns, Oklahoma State (AP-1)
 Ron Woolfork, Colorado (AP-1)
 Aubrey Beavers, Oklahoma (AP-1)

Defensive backs
 Jaime Mendez, Kansas State (AP-1)
 Chris Hudson, Colorado (AP-1)
 Thomas Randolph, Kansas State (AP-1)

Special teams

Place-kicker
 Ty Stewart, Iowa State (AP-1)

Punter
 Scott Tyner, Oklahoma State (AP-1)

Coach of the Year
 Bill Snyder, Kansas State (AP-1)

Key

AP = Associated Press

See also
 1993 College Football All-America Team

References

All-Big Seven Conference football team
All-Big Eight Conference football teams